Karkevand Rural District is a rural district (dehestan) in the Central District of Mobarakeh County, Isfahan Province, Iran. At the 2006 census, its population was 3,341, in 887 families.  The rural district has 10 villages.

References 

Rural Districts of Isfahan Province
Mobarakeh County